There have been five NASCAR Busch Series races named Budweiser 200:

 Budweiser 200 (Caraway), held at Caraway Speedway in 1982
 Budweiser 200 (Dover), held at Dover Downs International Speedway from 1984 to 1991
 Budweiser 200 (Bristol), held at Bristol International Raceway from 1985 to 1989
 Budweiser 200 (Jefco), held at Jefco Speedway from 1986 to 1987
 Carolina Pride / Budweiser 200, held at Myrtle Beach Speedway from 1989 to 1990